Economides, also transliterated as Economidis, Oikonomides or Oikonomidis, is a Greek surname. Notable people with the surname include:

Georgios Oikonomidis (born 1978), Greek sprinter
Giorgos Economides (born 1990), Cypriot footballer
Konstantinos Economidis (born 1977), Greek tennis player
Luc Economides (born 1999), French figure skater
Nicholas Economides, American academic
Nikolaos Oikonomides (1934–2000), Greek-Canadian Byzantist
Phil Economidis, Australian rugby league coach
Yannis Economides, Cypriot film director

Greek-language surnames